The University of Georgia Campus Arboretum is an arboretum located across the University of Georgia campus in Athens, Georgia. It is open daily without charge.

Today's arboretum is the third near campus. The first (1833–1854) was located east of campus, and the second (early 1900s) was on south campus. The first has entirely vanished, but a few trees remain of the second. Today's arboretum is organized into three walking tours through the North, Central, and South Campus. A free booklet provides maps and tree identification, and more than 150 campus trees are marked by plaques corresponding to the booklet.

The campus arboretum should not be confused with Georgia's state arboretum, also operated by the university but located in Thompson Mills Forest, Braselton, Georgia. It is also distinct from The State Botanical Garden of Georgia, organized in 1968 as the university's third botanical garden, and located off campus.

See also 
 List of botanical gardens and arboretums in Georgia (U.S. state)

References 

Arboreta in Georgia (U.S. state)
Botanical gardens in Georgia (U.S. state)
University of Georgia
Protected areas of Clarke County, Georgia
Tourist attractions in Athens, Georgia